William Ritchie (11 September 1936 – 10 March 2016) was a Scottish professional footballer who was best known for his time with Rangers.

Ritchie started his career at local side Bathgate Thistle before moving to Rangers in 1955. He played both legs of Rangers 1961 European Cup Winners' Cup Final defeat to Fiorentina.

He left Rangers in 1967 and joined Partick Thistle. Ritchie died on 10 March 2016, aged 79.

References

External links

1936 births
2016 deaths
Scottish footballers
Scotland international footballers
Scottish Football League players
Association football goalkeepers
Bathgate Thistle F.C. players
Rangers F.C. players
Partick Thistle F.C. players
Motherwell F.C. players
Stranraer F.C. players
Motherwell F.C. non-playing staff
Place of death missing